Menoufia University is one of the regional universities in Egypt, established in 1976. The university is characterized by rapid establishment and wide fame. The university started with four colleges (the College of Agriculture, the College of Engineering, the College of Education, and the College of Electronic Engineering), then it expanded and established many of its affiliated colleges until it became comprising about 80000 students, 3000 faculty members and assistant staff. The main headquarters of the university is located in Shebin El Kom. At the present time, the university includes 13 colleges and one institute after the separation of the faculties of the university branch in Sadat City, which has become the University of Sadat City.

References

External links 
 Official Website

Menoufia University
Educational institutions established in 1976
1976 establishments in Egypt